Silke Lemmens (born 30 November 1999) is a Swiss track and field sprinter. She represented Switzerland at the 2020 Summer Olympics in Tokyo 2021, competing in women's 4 × 400 metres relay.

References

External links
 

 

1999 births
Living people
Swiss female sprinters
Athletes (track and field) at the 2020 Summer Olympics
Olympic athletes of Switzerland
20th-century Swiss women
21st-century Swiss women